The 2020–21 Akron Zips men's basketball team represented the University of Akron during the 2020–21 NCAA Division I men's basketball season. The Zips, led by fourth-year head coach John Groce, played their home games at the James A. Rhodes Arena in Akron, Ohio as members of the East Division of the Mid-American Conference. In a season limited due to the ongoing COVID-19 pandemic, the Zips finished the season 15–8, 12–6 in MAC play to finish in a tie for third place. They defeated Bowling Green in the quarterfinals of the MAC tournament before losing to Buffalo in the semifinals.

Previous season

The Zips finished the 2019–20 season 24–7, 14–4 in MAC play to win the East Division. They were to play Ohio in the conference tournament before the season ended due to the COVID-19 pandemic.

Offseason

Departures

Incoming transfers

2020 recruiting class

2021 recruiting class

Roster

Schedule and results

Akron had to cancel its games against Middle Tennessee and Miami (OH) due to COVID-19. They have postponed games against Eastern Michigan and Ohio.

|-
!colspan=9 style=| Non-conference regular season

|-
!colspan=9 style=| MAC regular season

|-
!colspan=9 style=| MAC tournament

Source

Rankings

*AP does not release post-NCAA Tournament rankings

References

Akron Zips men's basketball seasons
Akron